All for You is the tenth studio album by Canadian heavy metal band Annihilator, released on May 24, 2004 by AFM Records. It was the first album to feature Dave Padden on vocals. It was also the second to feature Mike Mangini on drums.

Track listing

Credits
Jeff Waters - guitars, bass, backing vocals. Lead vocals on "Holding On", intro on "Dr. Psycho"
Dave Padden - vocals
Mike Mangini - drums

Additional personnel
Curran Murphy - additional guitars
Joe Bongiorno - additional guitars

References

Annihilator (band) albums
2004 albums
AFM Records albums
Groove metal albums